Georgi Kel'manovich Gitis (born 1977) is a Russian animator, director and producer.

He graduated from the Gerasimov Institute of Cinematography in 2001. There he completed his first animated film SemsOrochek in cooperation with Liza Skvortsova. In 2002-2004  he worked as a director and animator in the animation TV series Dyatlovy (REN TV Channel), which has won several awards at the Russian animation films festivals.

In 2008-2009 he worked at Paradise Studio as the director of the animated feature film Priklyuchenya Alenushki i Eremi (which became the first Russian 3D animation film in wide release) and its sequel Novye priklyucheniya Alenushki i Eremy. His Novye priklyucheniya Alenushki i Eremy won the Best Animation Award at the Kinotavrik-2010.

Since 2012 he has worked as executive producer and director at CTB Studio (animated feature films Ku! Kin-dza-dza, Kak poymat pero Zhar-Ptitsy).

Filmography 
 SemsOrochek (СемьсОрочек, 1999); director
 Dyatlovy (Дятловы, 2002-2004); director
 Za sokrovischami (За сокровищами, 2004-2005); director
 Lullabies of the World (Колыбельные мира, 2005-2009); writer 
 Priklyuchenya Alenushki i Eremi (Приключения Алёнушки и Ерёмы, 2008); director
 Novye priklyucheniya Alenushki i Eremy (Новые приключения Алёнушки и Ерёмы, 2009); director
 Vse - pobediteli (Все - победители, 2013); director, executive producer
 Ku! Kin-dza-dza (Ку! Кин-дза-дза, 2013); executive producer
 Kak poymat pero Zhar-Ptitsy (Как поймать перо жар-птицы); director, executive producer

References

External links
 Georgi Gitis at the Animator.ru 

Extensive interview with Georgi Gitis 

1977 births
Russian film directors
Russian animated film directors
Russian animated film producers
Russian animators
Living people